Induction to the International Bluegrass Music Hall of Fame, called the International Bluegrass Music Hall of Honor from its creation in 1991 through 2006, is managed by the International Bluegrass Music Association, and the Hall itself is maintained at the Bluegrass Music Hall of Fame & Museum, Owensboro, Kentucky.

Inductee selection
Each year a nominating committee creates a slate of 10-15 candidates. From these names, electors cast ballots to narrow the nominees to five finalists. There are over 200 electors who, themselves, must have participated actively in bluegrass for at least 10 years, and must merit respect and recognition for their accomplishments and/or knowledge in one or more aspects of the field.

After the five finalists have been selected, the electors again vote to select the inductee(s) for that year. The name(s) of the newest Hall of Honor inductee(s) are made public immediately following the final stage of balloting and the formal induction takes place each year during the International Bluegrass Music Awards Show. The plaques are displayed at the Bluegrass Music Hall of Fame & Museum in Owensboro, Kentucky.

Inductees

1991
Bill Monroe
Earl Scruggs
Lester Flatt

1992
The Stanley Brothers
Ralph Stanley
Carter Stanley
Reno and Smiley
Don Reno
Arthur Lee "Red" Smiley

1993
Mac Wiseman
Jim & Jesse
Jim McReynolds
Jesse McReynolds

1994
Osborne Brothers
Bobby Osborne
Sonny Osborne

1995
Jimmy Martin

1996
Peter V. Kuykendall
The Country Gentlemen
Charlie Waller
John Duffey
Eddie Adcock
Tom Gray

1997
Josh Graves

1998
Chubby Wise
Carlton Haney

1999
Kenny Baker

2000
Lance LeRoy
Doc Watson

2001
Carter Family
A. P. Carter
Sara Carter
Maybelle Carter

2002
The Lilly Brothers & Don Stover
Michael Burt "Bea" Lilly
Charles E. "Everett" Lilly
Don Stover
David Freeman

2003
J. D. Crowe

2004
John Ray "Curly" Seckler
Bill Vernon

2005
Red Allen
Benny Martin

2006
The Lewis Family
Syd Nathan

2007
Howard Watts ("Cedric Rainwater")
Carl Story

2008
Bill Clifton
Charles Wolfe

2009
Lonesome Pine Fiddlers
The Dillards

2010
John Hartford
Louise Scruggs

2011
Del McCoury
George Shuffler

2012
Doyle Lawson
Ralph Rinzler

2013
Tony Rice
Paul Warren

2014
Neil Rosenberg
The Original Seldom Scene

2015
Larry Sparks
Bill Keith

2016
Ken Irwin
Marian Leighton-Levy
Bill Nowlin
Clarence White

2017
Hazel Dickens & Alice Gerrard
Bobby Hicks
Roland White

2018
Vassar Clements
Tom T. Hall & Dixie Hall
Mike Seeger
Allen Shelton
Ricky Skaggs
Jake Tullock
Joe Val
Paul Williams
Terry Woodward

2019
Mike Auldridge
Bill Emerson
The Kentucky Colonels

2020
J.T. Gray
Johnson Mountain Boys
New Grass Revival

2021
Alison Krauss
Lynn Morris
The Stoneman Family

2022
Norman Blake
Paul "Moon" Mullins
Peter Rowan

See also
 List of music museums

References
International Bluegrass Music Museum's Hall of Fame list of inductees by year and the induction process

External links

Bluegrass music
Music halls of fame
Music
Awards established in 1991
1991 establishments in Kentucky